Big Brother Seven may refer to:

Big Brother (UK series 7)
Big Brother 7 (US)